Keith Mwila (November 1966 – 9 January 1993) was a Zambian boxer, who won the bronze medal in the men's Light flyweight (-48 kg) category at the 1984 Summer Olympics in Los Angeles, United States. He became the first Olympic medalist from Zambia.

Olympic results 
 Round of 32: bye
 Round of 16: Defeated Chung Pao Ming (Taiwan/Chinese Taipei) Referee stopped contest in second round 
 Quarterfinal Defeated Mamoru Kuroiwa (Japan) by decision, 5-0
 Lost to Salvatore Todisco (Italy) by decision, 0-5 (was awarded bronze medal)

References

External links

Article on Keith Mwila

1966 births
1993 deaths
Light-flyweight boxers
Olympic boxers of Zambia
Boxers at the 1984 Summer Olympics
Olympic bronze medalists for Zambia
Olympic medalists in boxing
Zambian male boxers
Medalists at the 1984 Summer Olympics